The Revolving Doors is a 1988 Canadian-French French-language drama film directed by Francis Mankiewicz. The film was selected as the Canadian entry for the Best Foreign Language Film at the 61st Academy Awards, but was not accepted as a nominee.

Synopsis

Céleste (Monique Spaziani), a jazz pianist, has reached the twilight of her years. Alone in her New York apartment, she looks back on her life and decides to record it all in a diary that she sends to her estranged son, Blaudelle (Gabriel Arcand). The arrival of the diary disrupts Blaudelle's life, although his son, Antoine (François Méthé), is intrigued, and it is through his eyes that Céleste's life is revealed.

Cast
 Monique Spaziani - Céleste
 Gabriel Arcand - Madrigal Blaudelle
 Miou-Miou - Lauda
 François Méthé - Antoine
 Jacques Penot - Pierre Blaudelle
 Françoise Faucher - Simone Blaudelle
 Jean-Louis Roux - Monsieur Blaudelle
 Rémy Girard - Monsieur Litwin
 Rita Lafontaine - Madame Beaumont
 Hubert Loiselle - Monsieur Beaumont
 Papa John Creach - John Devil
 Charles Reiner - Gunther
 Marcel Sabourin - Homme du Train
 Charlotte Laurier - Bonne
 Martin Faucher - Enfant Beaumont

Reception
The film was seen by less than 10,000 people in France.

Awards
 1989
 Genie Award for Best Achievement in Costume Design - François Barbeau - Won
 Genie Award for Best Performance by an Actor in a Supporting Role - Rémy Girard - Won
 Genie Award for Best Achievement in Art Direction/Production Design - Anne Pritchard - Nominated
 Genie Award for Best Achievement in Cinematography - Thomas Vámos - Nominated
 Genie Award for Best Achievement in Direction - Francis Mankiewicz - Nominated
 Genie Award for Best Motion Picture - Francyne Morin, René Malo - Nominated
 Genie Award for Best Music Score - François Dompierre - Nominated
 Genie Award for Best Performance by an Actress in a Leading Role - Monique Spaziani - Nominated
 Genie Award for Best Performance by an Actress in a Supporting Role - Miou-Miou - Nominated
 Genie Award for Best Adapted Screenplay - Jacques Savoie, Francis Mankiewicz - Nominated
 1988
 Cannes Film Festival Prize of the Ecumenical Jury - Special Mention - Francis Mankiewicz - Won. Screened in the Un Certain Regard section.

See also
 List of submissions to the 61st Academy Awards for Best Foreign Language Film
 List of Canadian submissions for the Academy Award for Best Foreign Language Film

References

Works cited

External links
 
 

1988 films
1988 drama films
Films based on Canadian novels
Films shot in Ontario
French drama films
Films directed by Francis Mankiewicz
Films set in Quebec
Canadian drama films
Films scored by François Dompierre
French-language Canadian films
1980s Canadian films
1980s French films